Do You Wanna may refer to:

 "Do You Wanna", a song by Gipsy.cz
 "Do You Wanna", a song by Modern Talking from The 1st Album, 1985
 "Do You Wanna", a song by The Stranglers from Black and White, 1978

See also
"Do You Want To", 2005 song by Franz Ferdinand